Kenneth Bernard Prewitt (December 14, 1946 — April 11, 2015) was an American radio news anchor who reported on economic news for CBS, ABC, and Bloomberg Radio networks.  Together with Tom Keene, he co-anchored Bloomberg Radio's flagship program, Bloomberg Surveillance, from 2005 to 2013.  According to Bloomberg, he was seen as the authoritative voice through interviewing many Wall Street billionaires and the former Federal Reserve chairman.  Prewitt died April 11, 2015, from complications caused by cancer.

See also
 Tom Keene

References

1946 births
University of North Carolina at Chapel Hill alumni
American radio news anchors
2015 deaths